This is a list of municipalities created in Quebec (Lower Canada) on July 1, 1845.

County of Beauharnois 
 Municipality of Dundee
 Municipality of Godmanchester
 Municipality of Ormstown
 Municipality of Russeltown
 Municipality of Saint-Anicet
 Parish of Saint-Clément
 Parish of Saint-Thimothée
 Parish of Sainte-Martine
 Township of Hemmingford
 Township of Hinchinbrooke

County of Bellechasse 
 Municipality of Saint-François-de-la-Rivière-du-Sud
 Municipality of Standon
 Parish of Beaumont
 Parish of Berthier-en-Bas
 Parish of Saint-Charles-Borromée-Rivière-Boyer
 Parish of Saint-Gervais
 Parish of Saint-Lazare
 Parish of Saint-Michel
 Parish of Saint-Vallier

County of Berthier 
 Municipality of Berthier-en-Haut
 Municipality of Brandon
 Municipality of Kildare
 Municipality of Saint-Cuthbert
 Municipality of Saint-Félix-de-Valois
 Municipality of Saint-Thomas-de-North-Jersey
 Municipality of Sainte-Elizabeth
 Municipality of Sainte-Mélanie
 Parish of L'Isle-du-Pads
 Parish of Lanoraie
 Parish of Lavaltrie
 Parish of Saint-Barthélemi-de-Dusablé
 Parish of Saint-Paul-de-Lavaltrie
 Parish of Village-d'Industrie

County of Bonaventure 
 Municipality of Matapédia
 Municipality of Shoolbred
 Township of Carleton
 Township of Cox
 Township of Hamilton
 Township of Hope
 Township of Mann
 Township of Maria
 Township of New Richmond
 Township of Port-Daniel

County of Chambly 
 Municipality of Chambly
 Municipality of Laprairie
 Municipality of Saint-Jean
 Parish of Blairfindie
 Parish of Boucherville
 Parish of Longueuil
 Parish of Saint-Bruno-de-Montarville
 Parish of Saint-Luc

County of Champlain 
 Parish of Batiscan
 Parish of Cap-de-la-Magdeleine
 Parish of Champlain
 Parish of Saint-Maurice
 Parish of Saint-Stanislas
 Parish of Sainte-Anne-de-la-Pérade
 Parish of Sainte-Geneviève-de-Batiscan

County of Dorchester 
 Municipality of Aubert-Gallion
 Municipality of Metschermet
 Municipality of Saint-Bernard
 Municipality of Saint-Elzéar
 Municipality of Saint-François-de-la-Beauce
 Municipality of Saint-Isidore
 Municipality of Sainte-Marie-de-la-Beauce
 Parish of Pointe-Lévi
 Parish of Saint-Anselme
 Parish of Saint-Henri-de-Lauzon
 Parish of Saint-Jean-Chrysostôme
 Parish of Saint-Joseph-de-la-Beauce
 Parish of Saint-Nicolas
 Parish of Sainte-Claire-de-Joliette
 Parish of Sainte-Marguerite-de-Joliette
 Township of Cranbourne
 Township of Frampton

County of Drummond 
 Municipality of Arthabaska
 Municipality of Aston
 Municipality of Blandford
 Municipality of Durham
 Municipality of Grantham
 Municipality of Kingsey
 Municipality of Tingwick
 Municipality of Upton
 Township of Stanfold
 Township of Wickham

County of Gaspé 
 Municipality of Baie-de-Gaspé
 Municipality of Cap-Chat
 Municipality of Cap-Rosier
 Municipality of Grande-Rivière
 Municipality of Isles-de-la-Magdelaine
 Municipality of Newport
 Township of Douglas
 Township of Malbay
 Township of Percé

County of Huntingdon 
 Municipality of Caughnawaga
 Municipality of Chateauguay
 Municipality of Lacolle
 Municipality of Laprairie
 Municipality of Saint-Édouard
 Municipality of Saint-Jacques-le-Mineur
 Parish of Saint-Constant
 Parish of Saint-Cyprien
 Parish of Saint-Isidore
 Parish of Saint-Philippe
 Parish of Saint-Rémi
 Parish of Saint-Valentin
 Parish of Sainte-Philomène

County of Kamouraska 
 Municipality of Rivière-Ouelle
 Municipality of Saint-André
 Municipality of Saint-Denis-de-la-Bouteillerie
 Municipality of Saint-Paschal-de-Kamouraska
 Municipality of Sainte-Anne-de-la-Pocatière
 Parish of Kamouraska

County of Leinster 
 Municipality of L'Assomption
 Municipality of Lachenaie
 Municipality of Saint-Lin
 Municipality of Saint-Sulpice
 Parish of Mascouche
 Parish of Repentigny
 Parish of Saint-Esprit
 Parish of Saint-Jacques-de-Saint-Sulpice
 Parish of Saint-Roch-de-l'Achigan
 Township of Rawdon

County of L'Islet 
 Municipality of Cap-Saint-Ignace
 Municipality of Islet
 Municipality of Port-Joli
 Municipality of Saint-Cyrille
 Municipality of Saint-Pierre-de-la-Rivière-du-Sud
 Municipality of Saint-Roch-des-Aulnets
 Parish of Isle-aux-Grues
 Parish of Saint-Thomas

County of Lac des Deux-Montagnes 
 Municipality of Argenteuil
 Municipality of Gore
 Municipality of Grenville
 Municipality of Saint-Benoît
 Municipality of Saint-Colomban
 Municipality of Saint-Eustache
 Municipality of Saint-Hermas
 Municipality of Sainte-Scholastique
 Parish of Saint-Augustin
 Parish of Saint-Raphaël
 Township of Chatham

County of Lotbinière 
 Municipality of Deschaillons
 Municipality of Lotbinière
 Municipality of Saint-Gilles
 Parish of Saint-Antoine-de-Tilly
 Parish of Saint-Flavien-de-Sainte-Croix
 Parish of Saint-Sylvestre-de-Beaurivage
 Parish of Sainte-Croix

County of Mégantic 
 Municipality of Broughton
 Municipality of Inverness
 Municipality of Ireland
 Municipality of Somerset
 Municipality of Tring
 Township of Halifax
 Township of Leeds

County of Missisquoi 
 Municipality of Frelighsburg
 Municipality of Philipsburg
 Township of Dunham
 Township of Stanbridge
 Township of Sutton

County of Montmorenci 
 Municipality of Féréol
 Parish of Ange-Gardien
 Parish of Château-Richer
 Parish of Saint-François
 Parish of Saint-Jean
 Parish of Saint-Joachim
 Parish of Saint-Laurent
 Parish of Saint-Pierre
 Parish of Sainte-Anne-Côte-Beaupré
 Parish of Sainte-Famille

County of Montréal 
 Municipality of Bout-de-l’Isle
 Municipality of Hochelaga
 Municipality of Pointe-Claire
 Municipality of Rivière-des-Prairies
 Municipality of Sault-au-Récollet
 Parish of Lachine
 Parish of Longue-Pointe
 Parish of Pointe-aux-Trembles
 Parish of Saint-Laurent
 Parish of Sainte-Geneviève

County of Nicolet 
 Parish of Bécancour
 Parish of Gentilly
 Parish of Nicolet
 Parish of Saint-Grégoire-le-Grand
 Parish of Saint-Pierre-les-Becquets
 Parish of Sainte-Monique

County of Ottawa 
 Township of Bristol
 Township of Hull
 Township of Templeton
 Township of Wakefield
 Municipality of Buckingham
 Municipality of Clarendon
 Municipality of La Petite-Nation
 Municipality of Lochaber
 Municipality of Onslow

County of Portneuf 
 Municipality of Cap-Santé
 Municipality of Deschambault
 Municipality of Grondines
 Municipality of Pointe-aux-Trembles
 Municipality of Saint-Bazile
 Municipality of Saint-Casimir
 Municipality of Saint-Raymond
 Parish of Écureuils
 Parish of Saint-Augustin
 Parish of Sainte-Catherine

County of Québec 
 Municipality of Beauport
 Municipality of Saint-Dunstan
 Municipality of Saint-Roch
 Municipality of Stadacona
 Municipality of Stoneham
 Municipality of Valcartier
 Parish of Ancienne-Lorette
 Parish of Charlesbourg
 Parish of Saint-Ambroise
 Parish of Saint-Foye

County of Richelieu 
 Municipality of Saint-Ours
 Municipality of Sorel
 Parish of Saint-Aimé
 Parish of Saint-Barnabé
 Parish of Saint-Charles
 Parish of Saint-Denis
 Parish of Saint-Jude
 Parish of Sainte-Victoire

County of Rimouski 
 Municipality of Bic
 Municipality of Isle-Verte
 Municipality of Kakonna
 Municipality of Lepage
 Municipality of Lessard
 Municipality of Matane
 Municipality of Métis
 Municipality of Rimouski
 Municipality of Rivière-du-Loup
 Municipality of Saint-Simon-de-la-Baie-Ha! Ha!
 Municipality of Trois-Pistoles

County of Rouville 
 Municipality of Clarenceville
 Municipality of Foucault
 Municipality of Henryville
 Municipality of Rouville
 Municipality of Saint-Grégoire-le-Grand-de-Monnoir
 Municipality of Saint-Jean-Baptiste
 Parish of Saint-Athanase
 Parish of Saint-Mathias
 Parish of Sainte-Marie-de-Monnoir

County of Saguenay 
 Municipality of Bagot
 Municipality of Chicoutimi
 Municipality of Malbaie
 Municipality of Saint-Irénée
 Municipality of Saint-Urbain
 Municipality of Tadoussac
 Parish of Baie-Saint-Paul
 Parish of Eboulemens
 Parish of Isle-aux-Coudres
 Parish of Petite-Rivière
 Parish of Sainte-Agnès

County of Saint-Hyacinthe 
 Municipality of Abbotsford
 Municipality of Saint-Césaire
 Municipality of Saint-Dominique
 Municipality of Saint-Simon
 Parish of La Présentation
 Parish of Saint-Damase
 Parish of Saint-Hugues
 Parish of Saint-Hyacinthe
 Parish of Saint-Pie
 Parish of Sainte-Rosalie

County of Saint-Maurice 
 Municipality of Dumontier
 Municipality of Gatineau
 Municipality of Maskinongé
 Municipality of Pointe-du-Lac
 Municipality of Rivière-du-Loup-en-Haut
 Municipality of Trois-Rivières
 Municipality of Yamachiche
 Parish of Sainte-Ursule

County of Shefford 
 Municipality of Ely
 Township of Brome
 Township of Farnham
 Township of Granby
 Township of Milton
 Township of Shefford
 Township of Stukely

County of Sherbrooke 
 Municipality of Ascot
 Municipality of Brompton
 Municipality of Bury
 Municipality of Compton
 Municipality of Dudswell
 Municipality of Eaton
 Municipality of Hereford
 Municipality of Melbourne
 Municipality of Windsor
 Township of Shipton

County of Stanstead 
 Municipality of Barnston
 Township of Bolton
 Township of Hatley
 Township of Potton
 Township of Stanstead

County of Terrebonne 
 Municipality of Lacorne
 Municipality of Saint-François-de-Sales
 Municipality of Saint-Jérôme
 Municipality of Saint-Vincent-de-Paul
 Municipality of Terrebonne
 Parish of Saint-Martin
 Parish of Sainte-Anne-des-Plaines
 Parish of Sainte-Rose
 Parish of Sainte-Thérèse

County of Vaudreuil 
 Municipality of Coteau-du-Lac
 Municipality of Isle-Perrot
 Municipality of Newton
 Municipality of Nouvelle-Longueuil
 Municipality of Rigaud
 Municipality of Soulanges
 Municipality of Vaudreuil

County of Verchères 
 Municipality of Contrecoeur
 Municipality of Saint-Antoine
 Municipality of Varennes
 Municipality of Verchères
 Parish of Beloeil
 Parish of Saint-Marc

County of Yamaska 
 Municipality of Yamaska
 Parish of Saint-Antoine-de-la-Baie-du-Febvre
 Parish of Saint-David-de-Deguir
 Parish of Saint-François-du-Lac-Saint-Pierre
 Parish of Saint-Zéphirin-de-Courval

Local government in Quebec
Political history of Quebec

Municipalities Created
19th century in Quebec
1840s in Quebec
1845 in Canada
1845 in Quebec